III or iii may refer to:

Companies
 Information International, Inc., a computer technology company
 Innovative Interfaces, Inc., a library-software company
 3i, formerly Investors in Industry, a British investment company

Other uses
 Institute for Information Industry, research institute in Taiwan
 Insurance Information Institute, a US industry organization
 Insurance Institute of India, an Indian organisation for training
 Intelligence and Information Institute, a fictional US government organization in the comic version of Transformers
 Interactive Investor International
 Interstate Identification Index, an index of criminal records maintained by the FBI

See also
 3 (disambiguation), including all uses of the Roman numeral "III" as a number
1/3 (disambiguation)
Number Three (disambiguation)
The Third (disambiguation)
Third (disambiguation)
Third party (disambiguation)
Third person (disambiguation)

3 (number)